Cloverdale Transit is a local bus route operated by Sonoma County Transit serving the city of Cloverdale, California.

Sonoma County Transit operates the weekday-only service as Route 68, also known as the Cloverdale Shuttle. Local 68 follows a loop route that serves the Furber Ranch Shopping Center, South Cloverdale Boulevard, and downtown Cloverdale.

External links
transit511.org - Cloverdale Transit schedules
Cloverdale Transit info at City of Cloverdale

Notes

Bus transportation in California
Public transportation in Sonoma County, California